Into the Clouds is a single by Swedish duo The Sound of Arrows. Later in December 2, 2009 was released EP.

Video clip

 Artist: The Sound of Arrows
 Title: Into The Clouds
 Director: The Sound of Arrows, Mattias Erik Johansson
 DoP: Emil Klang

Track listings

 CD
 «Into The Clouds» — 3:49
 «And Beyond» — 5:54
 «Into The Clouds» (Fear of Tigers Remix) — 4:57
 «Into The Clouds» (Gold Dust Remix) — 5:13

 vinyl 12"

Side A

 «Into The Clouds» — 3:49
 «And Beyond» — 5:54

Side B

 «Into The Clouds» (Fear of Tigers Remix) — 4:57
 «Into The Clouds» (Gold Dust Remix) — 5:13

Personnel 

 The Sound of Arrows — lyrics, music, production
 Jon Gray — mixing (tracks: 6)
 Dan Grech — mixing (tracks: 2)

References

External links
 

2009 singles
The Sound of Arrows songs
2009 songs